Charles Thomas Hewett (about 1794 – 5 April 1871) was an English born South Australian pioneer of the Noarlunga area of South Australia, particularly in the areas south of the Onkaparinga River, and politician.

He left England on the ship 'Duchess of Northumberland' on the 5 August 1839, arriving at Holdfast Bay, South Australia on 17 December 1839 with his wife, Hannah, and seven children.

Family
He was the son of John Hewett and Mary Ann née Torr, and married twice to Hannah Jane Moore on 5 April 1824 in St. Saviour, Dartmouth, Devon, England and Catherine Westlake (née Stumbles) in 1846 in South Australia. There were seven children born in England and eight born in Australia.

References

1794 births
1871 deaths
Members of the South Australian House of Assembly
English emigrants to Australia
19th-century Australian politicians
People from South Hams (district)
Settlers of South Australia
Explorers of South Australia